Mavazekhan-e Shomali Rural District is in Khvajeh District of Heris County, East Azerbaijan province, Iran. At the National Census of 2006, its population was 5,918 in 1,297 households. There were 4,762 inhabitants in 1,296 households at the following census of 2011. At the most recent census of 2016, the population of the rural district was 4,527 in 1,422 households. The largest of its 28 villages was Gavij, with 551 people.

References 

Heris County

Rural Districts of East Azerbaijan Province

Populated places in East Azerbaijan Province

Populated places in Heris County